The Discount Bank Tower is a skyscraper located on Yehuda HaLevi Street 23 corner with Herzl Street in Tel Aviv, Israel. It is the headquarters of the Discount Bank.

Completed in 2006, three years after construction began in 2003, the tower has 30 floors, 7 basement floors, and is 105 meters in height. Construction of the tower took place in two stages, with construction of the first 13 floors ending in 2006, and the upper 17 floors being constructed after the tower was partly occupied.

The Tel Aviv municipality granted a building permit on condition that the bank preserve the historic Schiff House next door, which was restored and reopened as a museum of banking.

See also
List of skyscrapers in Israel
Architecture of Israel
Economy of Israel

References

External links
Bank Discount Tower on Emporis
Bank Discount Tower on CTBUH
Bank Discount Tower on Skyscraperpage.com
Bank Discount Tower on Structurae

Recanati family
Office buildings completed in 2006
Skyscrapers in Tel Aviv